The Middlesex Street Estate is a housing estate in the Portsoken ward on the east edge of the City of London. It was connected to other local buildings by an elevated walkway system called the City of London Pedway Scheme.

The estate was built between 1965 and 1970 for the Corporation of London and comprises the 23-storey Petticoat Tower and low-rise buildings around Petticoat Square. The materials are concrete, including slotted concrete for balconies, and engineered brick.

The estate includes 146 low-rise dwellings and the 88 apartments in the tower block.

It was the main filming location for the 2017 Netflix film iBoy.

References

Housing estates in London